Lucy St. Louis (born 26 October 1992) is an English actress and singer. From 27 July 2021 to early 2023, she played Christine Daaé in the West End production of The Phantom of the Opera and from 6 March 2023, she's playing Glinda in the West End production of Wicked, making her the first black performer to do so in the UK. She has also played Diana Ross in Motown: The Musical, Antonia in Man of La Mancha, Guenevere in Camelot in Concert, and Little Eva in Beautiful: The Carole King Musical.

Early life
St. Louis was born in London. She began her  vocal training from the age of seven. She left school at sixteen to pursue the performing arts. She trained at Laine Theatre Arts and was cast in Ragtime halfway through her final year.

Filmography

Stage

Awards and nominations

References

External links
 
 Lucy St. Louis at Curtis Brown

Living people
1980s births
Year of birth uncertain
Actresses from London
Black British actresses
English musical theatre actresses
English sopranos